Kevin Swanson may refer to:

Kevin Swanson (Family Guy), fictional character from the animated television series Family Guy
Kevin Swanson (ice hockey) (born 1980), Canadian ice hockey goaltender 
Kevin Swanson (pastor), a Christian pastor in Colorado known for his views on homosexuality
Cub Swanson, Kevin "Cub" Swanson, American mixed martial artist